Duane Isely (1918–2000) was an American professor of botany and an expert on seed technology and weeds.

Biography
Isely was born to Dwight Isely, a professor of entomology, and Blessie Elise, both of whom studied and worked at the University of Arkansas. He too graduated from the University of Arkansas with a bachelor's degree in 1938 and a master's degree in 1939. In 1942 he received his PhD from Cornell University with thesis supervisor Walter Conrad Muenscher (1891–1963). From 1942 to 1944 Isely conducted studies on the herbaceous plants of the reservoirs being constructed for the Tennessee Valley Authority. In 1944 he was appointed an extension associate at Iowa State University, where he was put in charge of the seed laboratory. At Iowa State University he was an assistant professor from 1947 to 1948, an associate professor from 1949 to 1955, and a full professor from 1956 to 1981. He was appointed Distinguished Professor in 1981 and retired in 1989 as professor emeritus.

As a specialist in seed technology, Isely published a textbook and more than 50 articles on the subject. In addition, he was an active weed scientist, publishing about 20 books and laboratory manuals on native weeds and naturalized legumes (Fabaceae) from the United States (excluding Alaska and Hawaii). He collected legumes in most of the states of the US and his total of collected specimens exceeded 11,000. In the 1980s he played an important role in having the Iowa State University Herbarium renamed in honor of Ada Hayden.

He was married three times. There were two children from his first marriage.

Selected publications

Books 
  (pbk reprint of 1994 original, Iowa State University Press)
 with Lloyd M. Wax and Richard S. Fawcett:

References

External links 

American botanists
1918 births
2000 deaths
University of Arkansas alumni
Cornell University alumni
Iowa State University faculty